The Lao Football Federation is the governing body of football in Laos. It is responsible for the Laos national football team as well as national competitions like the Lao League 1, Lao League 2, Lao FF Cup and the LFF National Championship.

Presidents
  Bountiem Phissamay (–2008)
  Phouvanh Vongsouthi (2008–2010)
  Viphet Sihachakr (2010–2013)
  Pasatxay Philahandeth (2014-2016)
  Viphet Sihachakr (2017- )

Staff

References

External links
 Laos at the FIFA website.
 Laos at AFC site

Football in Laos
Asian Football Confederation member associations
Sports organizations established in 1951
1951 establishments in French Indochina